The Starve Creek is a tidal creek in South Eleuthera, the Bahamas.

See also
List of rivers of the Bahamas

References

Rivers of the Bahamas